A series of destructive tornadoes struck North Dakota and Iowa as part of a much larger severe weather event that took place on June 27, 1953. The worst tornado was a violent F5 tornado that obliterated farmlands east of Anita, Iowa. In all, five tornadoes touched down, killing one, injuring five, and causing $305,000 (1953 USD) in damage. Several other casualties also occurred from non-tornadic events that day as well.

Meteorological synopsis
A large area of severe thunderstorms formed over an area stretching from Colorado to Iowa, producing wind, hail, flooding, and lightning. The tornado activity was mostly confined to a small zone in central Iowa, where an outflow boundary branched off a low-pressure system in the western part of state along the southern portion of the state coupled with a tight pressure gradient at 500 mb level. Temperatures in the area were in the upper 70s to upper 90s with dewpoint values in the lower 70s. Iowa had four tornadoes over a four-hour and 15 minute period. An additional tornado also touched down in eastern North Dakota. The severe activity spread eastward over the next two days, bringing additional severe weather impacts all the way to the East Coast of the United States.

Confirmed tornadoes

Non-tornadic events
Two people were injured in Indianola while another was injured in Ottumwa. Seven hereford cows were also killed by lightning in Mt. Vernon as well. Another severe squall line moved through Milwaukee, Wisconsin, with high winds damaging buildings and vehicles. One person drowned after their sailboat was overturned and three others were injured elsewhere throughout the city. In Missouri, a boy was injured in Linneus and seven Holstein cows were killed in Savannah due to lightning. Several farms and towns in Kansas also suffered damage due to lightning, strong winds, and hail the size of golf balls.

See also
List of F5 and EF5 tornadoes
List of North American tornadoes and tornado outbreaks
August 2020 Midwest derecho

Notes

References

Tornadoes of 1953
Tornadoes in North Dakota
Tornadoes in Iowa
F5 tornadoes